Anup D'Costa (born 7 January 1993 in Kundapura, Karnataka) is an Indian volleyball player, represented India in 2010 Asian Youth Boys Volleyball Championship held in Azadi Volleyball Hall, Tehran, Iran from 13 to 21 May 2010. He was judged Best Scorer of the Championship.He is Ekalavya award winner.

Early life
Anup D'Costa was born on 7 January 1993 at Kundapur village, Karnataka. He started playing from 2007. In 2008, he got national attention when he played Junior national from Karnataka Team. Because of his national level recognition, he was rewarded with a job in Income Tax department in 2013.

Professional life

Anup is an integral part of Income Tax Department team. He wears number 07 jersey and plays in the position of Universal. Anup D'Costa has also been awarded as the Best scorer in Asian Youth Championship(2010) and in World Championship(2013).

Awards

 He received Eklayva Award in year 2016 by Karnataka State government.
 He received KOA Award in year 2012 by Karnataka State government.
 He received Kemp'gowda Award in year 2015 by Karnataka State government.

References

Indian men's volleyball players
Living people
1993 births
People from Udupi district
Volleyball players from Karnataka